Hazrat Mawlana Pir Fazal Ali Shah Qureshi was an Islamic scholar and the leading Naqshbandi Shaikh of colonial India in the early twentieth century. He was born to Murad Ali Shah in 1270 AH (1853 or 1854) in Daud Khel, Punjab, and died at 84 in the first night of Ramadan 1354 AH (28 November 1935) and was buried at Miskeenpur shareef, district Muzaffargarh, Punjab.

Tariqat
He was a Shaikh of Naqshbandi Sufi order. He first went to Khwaja Muhammad Usman Damani for Ba'yah, but he was too old to take new followers. So he took the oath of allegiance with Sayyad Laal Shah Hamdani, who was a khalifa of Khwaja Usman. After the death of his Shaikh, he then did second oath of allegiance with the son and successor of Khwaja Usman, Khwaja Sirajuddin Naqshbandi and received Ijazah and Khilafat from him.

Tabligh (Preaching)
He established the first spiritual center (Dargah/Khanqah) named Faqirpur Shareef in 1892 AH in district Muzaffargarh, Punjab. Due to the hard-to-reach location of Faqirpur, he established another spiritual center named Miskeenpur Shareef in the same district, near Shahar Sultan. He lived there for the rest of his life and was buried there.

His biographers have written that the number of days he spent in traveling for preaching, was greater than the days he spent at home. He traveled to many places of Sindh and Punjab, and also traveled to (current day) India for multiple times. He followed Hanafi school of law, and avoided the local schools of thought in India namely Deobandi Barelvi, rather followed the Naqshbandi school in all matters.

Deobandi school

There are conflicting accounts from the shaikh's biography about his following the Deobandi branch of the Hanafi school of thought. Many of his followers follow this school and claim that the shaikh himself followed it. But there are others who claim that the shaikh never followed the Deobandi school, rather merely visited the Deoband Islamic school for preaching Islam and Naqshbandi tariqa. This difference of opinion is even evident in the immediate family of Pir Qureshi, where some of his grandsons follow the Deobandi school while others follow the shaykh himself and do not affiliate to the Deoband.

Shaykh Pir Qureshi and scholars of Deoband
Mawlana Abdul Malik writes in Tajalliyat that once the shaykh was in madrasah of Deoband, and at the time of Zuhr prayer, Qari Muhammad Tayyab came to lead the congregation. He had covered his head with a cap. After the prayer, the Shaykh said "Lack of following the great Sunnah even in the center of learning?", pointing to the lack of following the Sunnah of Amama (turban) during prayer. At this, Qari sahib asked someone to bring the Amama and put it near the place of Imam, so whoever would lead the congregation, would take that and place it on the head.

In the same book, Mawlana Siddiqi narrates that the mentioned scholar Qari Muhammad Tayyab was indeed too happy to see the shaykh and invited him at his home for food. Pir Qureshi accepted it and visited him. When the shaykh was leaving from his home, Qari Tayyab, out of pleasure and deep respect, helped the shaykh put on his shoes. This is a sign of deep esteem and respect in Sufism, and shows esteem the scholars of Deoband gave to the shaykh.

Another famous Deobandi scholar, Syed Ata Ullah Shah Bukhari was also devoted to the shaykh. Once he was traveling and passed near the village of shaykh and visited him. Pir Qureshi was ploughing his farm at the time. When Syed Bukhari met him and requested for praying for him, the shaykh taught him the Zikr-e-Qalbi (the remembrance of heart, the first lesson of Naqshbandi Sufi order). Syed Ata'ullah narrates that his heart immediately started doing this Zikr. From that time, Syed Bukhari was deeply devoted to the shaykh and is reported to have met him multiple times.

Beliefs
Many of his followers maintain that Pir Qureshi believed in plain Sunni beliefs and did not follow any of the offshoots of Sunni Islam in India. Following points from the Malfuzat of Pir Mitha, who was one of his chief Khulafa, assert this idea.

Shaykh Fazal Ali Sahib built himself a covered room meant to be his final burial place, and told this to Pir Mitha and Mawlana Abdul Sattar (brothers and khulafa of Pir Qureshi) and asked them to bury him there. At the time of death, Mawlana Abdul Sattar was there and he told the people the Shaykh's will, so they buried him there. This is in contradiction to the Deobandi rulings that the grave must not be covered.

Pir Fazal Ali Sahib attended the Urs of Sufi saints of India and the gatherings of Mawlid. This also is in contradiction to the Deobandi doctrine that the practice of Urs is bid‘ah. The most famous is his attending the Urs of Khwaja Moinuddin Chishti in Ajmer, India, where the Shaikh not only attended the Urs but also listened to the Qawwali (sung with music) which is prohibited in the Deobandi doctrine. Though the Shaikh himself never listened to the music neither allowed his followers, he listened to the Qawwali only due to the love of Khwaja Moinuddin Chishti Ajmeri.

He also openly proclaimed and would call upon Muhammad saying Ya-Rasulullah which is also evident from his biography and the Naat written by him

Peer Fazal Ali Shaykh Qureshi also believed that making the tombs at the shrines of Sufi saints is a righteous practice, and also believed in covering the graves of saints with embroidered clothes, a practice common on most of the Sufi shrines. Deobandi scholars strictly prohibit these practices.

In short, he was an Ashiq e Rasool, a Sufi and a Sunni (Ahl e Sunnah Wal Jamaah) scholar.

Spiritual chain of succession

Shaykh Pir Fazal Ali Qureshi belongs to the Mujaddidi order of Sufism, which is the main branch of Naqshbandi Sufi tariqah. His spiritual lineage goes to Muhammad, through Shaikh Ahmad Sirhindi, the Mujaddid of eleventh Hijri century.

Notable Khulafa

 Pir Abdul Malik Siddiquiof (Islamabad)
 Khwaja Noor Buksh
 Mawlan Abdul Ghafoor Al-Abbasi Al-Madani (Shrine at Jannat-ul-Baqi) 
 Khwaja Abdul Ghaffar Naqshbandi commonly known as Pir Mitha (Larkana, Sindh)
 Mawlana Abdul Sattar Naqshbandi, brother of Khwaja Abdul Ghaffar Naqshbandi (Jalalpur-Pirwala, Punjab)
 Hazrat Hafiz Mawlana Abdul Aziz Rehmatullah Allaha (Dera Ghazi Khan Umer Basti)
Arif Billah Mawlana Khawaja Ali Murtazah Sahib (Gadai, Dera Ghazi Khan, Punjab)

Successor
The current successor or Sajjada Nasheen at Khanqah Naqshbandia Fazlia Miskeenpur Sharif is Maulana Muhammad Shah Qureshi Sahib. He is the son of Maulana Kaleemullah Shah Sahib who is the Grandson of Pir Qureshi and was affiliated with Maulana Abdul Ghafoor Abbasi Madni. Maulana Muhammad Shah Sahib received Ijazah of Naqshbandi tariqah from Maulana Kaleemullah Shah Sahib.

He is said to have about 66 Khulafa, many of whom became prominent Shaikhs after his demise. The most famous of them was Khwaja Abdul Ghaffar Naqshbandi Fazali. Born at Jalalpur-Pirwala near Mutan, he traveled to Sindh on the command of his Shaikh, and later migrated to Rahmatpur, Larkana, Sindh. He had more than a hundred Khulafa. He died in 1964 and was buried in Rahmatpur, Larkana. He himself had about 143 Khulafa, and was succeeded by Khwaja Allah Bakhsh Abbasi alias Sohna Saeen, whose son, Khwaja Muhammad Tahir is currently living and a leading Shaikh of Naqshbandi Sufi order in Pakistan.

Khwaja Abdul Ghaffar and his brother Khwaja Abdul Sattar were both Khulafa of Pir Qureshi. Pir Qureshi once told Khwaja Abdul Ghaffar that I have never given Khilafat (Ijazah) to any two brothers before. You belong to such a family that if your elder brother (Mawlana Muhammad Ashraf) and your father (Mawlana Yar Muhammad) were alive, I would have given Khilafat to both of them.

Another one of his most prominent, the youngest and the last living Khalifa/successor was Shaykh Ali Murtaza Sahib (1907 - 1988) of Gadai Dera Ghazi Khan Punjab Pakistan, Shaykh Pir Ali Murtaza Sahib was the son of a great scholar the Shaikh ul Hadith of Bhopal and Hyderabad Deccan (Moulana Muhammad Hussain Saheb) a very good friend of Pir Qureshi too. Once Shaykh Fazal Ali Qureshi Sahib came to Gadai shareef, Dera Ghazi Khan and met Molana Muhammad Hussain sahib and said to him "I can smell odour of Madinah shareef from your house. Call your son."

Maulana Muhammad Hussain sahib asked "which one?" As he had two sons. Shaykh Fazal Ali Qureshi said the young one (Shaykh Ali Murtaza). Shaykh Fazal Ali Qureshi Sahib took hold of the young Shaykh Ali Murtaza sahib and made him his mureed in his own house. He was the only Khalifa given the name/title 'Fragrance of Madinah'.

Alhamduillah the Silsila of Pir Fazal Ali Qureshi has spread widely across the globe and the Western world through Shaykh Ali Murtaza Sahib, the first ever spiritual Sufi centre (Khanqah) in Europe was established in Manchester (UK) by Shyakh Ali Murtaza Sahib's Khalifa Shaykh Asif Hussain Farooqui Sahib in the 1970s.

He had 59 khalifas, his main Successor/Khalifa and the current leader of the Naqshbandi Mujaddidi order is Shaykh Asif Hussain Farooqui sahib- Resident in Manchester UK.

Another one of his prominent Khalifa was Mawlana Abdul Ghafoor Abbasi Madani, Who actively preached the silsila in the subcontinent at first and then later after his migration to Madina tul Munawwarah the silsila was very actively spread across the Hijaz al Muqaddas, he had ziyarah to establish the Naqshbandi Mujaddidi khanqah in Madina. Many of Shaykh Pir Fazal ali Qureshi's Khulafaa upon visiting the blessed city would stay at this Khanqah. He died in Madina and is buried in Al-Baqee.

Pir Fazal Ali shah Qureshi Sahib did have sons but not paternal grandsons. At Dargah Miskeenpur Sharif, his maternal grandsons reside who all are Islamic scholars and Shaikhs. Mawlana Muhammad Rafiq Shah Qureshi Sahib is an Islamic scholar who studied at Dargah Allahabad near Kandiaro in Sindh, and received Ijazah of Naqshbandi tariqah from Khwaja Sohna Saeen. He is currently associated with Khwaja Muhammad Tahir Bakhshi, son and successor of Sohna Saeen. He is the son of Mawlana Abdul-Rauf Shah who was the son-in-law of Pir Qureshi and was affiliated with Shaykh Sohna Saeen.

References

External links
 Very Short Biography in Urdu
 Short Biography in Urdu by Mukhtar Ahmed Khokhar
 Book about his biography (in Urdu) by Mawlana Habib-ur-Rahman Gabol
 Samples from his poetry
 Few letters of Pir Fazal Ali Qureshi
 Website of Miskeenpur under the supervision of Pir Muhammad Shah Qureshi
 Beauty of Islam - www.beautyofislam.org
 

20th-century Muslim scholars of Islam
Year of birth missing
Naqshbandi order
People from British India
Punjabi Sufi saints
Sufi teachers
1935 deaths
People from Muzaffargarh
People from Muzaffargarh District